I'll Never Fall in Love Again is the thirteenth studio album by American singer Dionne Warwick, released on April 27, 1970 by the Scepter label. It was produced by Burt Bacharach and Hal David. In 1971, the album won the Grammy Award for Best Female Pop Vocal Performance.

History
The album is notable for including the title track, which became Warwick's eighth top ten hit on the Billboard Hot 100, peaking at number 6. Also featured are two other chart singles:  "Let Me Go to Him" and "Paper Maché".

Track listing

Personnel
Dionne Warwick - vocals
Burt Bacharach, Larry Wilcox - arrangements
Larry Levine, Phil Ramone - audio engineer
Burt Goldblatt - art direction, cover design
Harry Langdon - photography

Charts

References

External links
I'll Never Fall in Love Again at Discogs

1970 albums
Dionne Warwick albums
albums arranged by Burt Bacharach
Albums produced by Burt Bacharach
Albums produced by Hal David
Scepter Records albums
Grammy Award for Best Female Pop Vocal Performance